Over the years Raj Comics has published over 150 comics of Nagraj. Here is a list of all the comics featuring character Nagraj in them.

Nagraj's Solo Comic Issues
Nagraj has been presented in many crossover issues. Raj Comics has published the following titles as Nagraj's solo issues:

Nagraj's Multistarrer Comics list in Sequence Order

Raj Comics has published a number of multistarrer titles on Nagraj.

Raj Comics
Indian comics